The Nigerian Society of Chemical Engineers (NSChE) is an organization for chemical engineers in Nigeria. NSChE was officially inaugurated on 12 March 1969 at a meeting at BP House in Lagos attended by twenty four Chemical Engineers, all trained abroad. In 1999 it became a Division of the Nigerian Society of Engineers.  The Society publishes the Nigerian Society of Chemical Engineering Journal.

Chapters
The following Chapters have been granted Charter status by the Council.
 
Anambra/Enugu/Ebonyi States 
Oyo/Osun States 
Kaduna/Kastina States 
Lagos/Ogun States 
Rivers/Bayelsa States
Cross River/Akwa Ibom
Imo/Abia States 
Edo/Delta States 
Kwara/Kogi States 
Adamawa/Bauchi/Benue/Yobe/Gombe/Taraba States (ABBYGOT) 
Benue Industrial 
FCT/Niger Chapter 
United States of America (USA) Chapter

Student chapters
The following student chapters have also been granted Charter Status by the Council:

Obafemi Awolowo University, Ile-Ife 
Chukwuemeka Odumegwu Ojukwu University, uli
Ahmadu Bello University, Zaria 
University of Lagos, Akoka, Lagos 
University of Port Harcourt, Port Harcourt 
Rivers State University of Science and Technology, Nkpolu, Port Harcourt; 
Lagos State University, Ojo; 
Ladoke Akintola University of Technology, Ogbomoso 
Enugu State University of science and Technology, Enugu 
Federal University of Technology, Owerri; 
Federal university of Technology Yola now known as(Mautech)
Kaduna Polytechnic, Kaduna 
University of Benin, Benin City 
Petroleum Training Institute, Effurun
Auchi Polytechnic, Auchi
Michael Okpara University of Agriculture
Umudike Abia state

References

 NSChE website

Chemical engineering organizations
Professional associations based in Nigeria
Organizations based in Lagos
1969 establishments in Nigeria
Organizations established in 1969